Lanista is a genus of African bush-crickets (Orthoptera: Tettigoniidae) in the subfamily Conocephalinae.

Species
 Lanista affinis Bolívar, 1906
 Lanista annulicornis (Walker, 1869)
 Lanista crassicollis Bolívar, 1906
 Lanista varelai Bolívar, 1906

References

Tettigoniidae
Orthoptera genera